The 1920 Saint Louis Billikens football team was an American football team that represented Saint Louis University during the 1920 college football season. In their third and final season under head coach Charles M. Rademacher, the Billikens compiled a 3–6 record and was outscored by a total of 220 to 81.

Schedule

References

Saint Louis
Saint Louis Billikens football seasons
Saint Louis Billikens football